The women's basketball tournament of the 2014 Asian Games was held at the 7,406 seat Samsan World Gymnasium, and at the 5,158 seat Hwaseong Indoor Arena in Incheon, South Korea from 23 September to 2 October 2014.

With the 2014 FIBA World Championship for Women having been held at the same time as the Asian Games, teams who participated in both tournaments sent two different squads to both Turkey and Incheon. China and Japan sent their "A" team to the World Championship and the "B" team to the Asian Games, while the Koreans did the reverse. The best six teams from the basketball competition of the 2010 Asian Games that participated in 2014 received a bye to the finals.

Prior to the start of the Qatar v Mongolia game in the qualifying round, officials told the Qatari players to take off their headscarves; the players refused, walked off the court and forfeited the game. The Qatari team subsequently withdrew in protest and flew home, but due to communication issues, the organizers were unaware of these events.

After Qatar failed to appear for their game against Nepal the following night, they were disqualified, with this and their remaining games declared forfeited.

Squads

Results
All times are Korea Standard Time (UTC+09:00)

Qualifying round

Final round

Quarterfinals

Classification (5–8)

Semifinals

Classification 7th–8th

Classification 5th–6th

Bronze medal game

Gold medal game

Final standing

References

women